Edgar Molinos (born 28 August 1971) is a Guamanian weightlifter. He competed in the men's middleweight event at the 1992 Summer Olympics.

References

1971 births
Living people
Guamanian male weightlifters
Olympic weightlifters of Guam
Weightlifters at the 1992 Summer Olympics
Place of birth missing (living people)